Mtemere Airstrip (TCAA designation: TZ-0048) is an airstrip serving the Selous Game Reserve in Southern Tanzania.

Airlines and destinations

See also

 List of airports in Tanzania
 Transport in Tanzania

References

External links

OurAirports - Mtemere
OpenStreetMap - Mtemere

Airstrips in Tanzania
Buildings and structures in the Lindi Region